Patton State Hospital is a forensic psychiatric hospital in San Bernardino, California, United States. Though the hospital has a Patton, California address, it lies entirely within the San Bernardino city limits.  Operated by the California Department of State Hospitals, Patton State Hospital is a forensic hospital with a licensed bed capacity of 1287 for people who have been committed by the judicial system for treatment.

History
Established in 1890 and opened in 1893 as the Southern California State Asylum for the Insane and Inebriates, it was renamed Patton State Hospital after Harry Patton, a member of the first Board of Managers, in 1927. The hospital's original structure was built in accordance with the Kirkbride Plan. The original buildings were demolished after they were badly damaged in the earthquake of 1923.

Accreditation
The hospital is accredited by the Joint Commission on Accreditation of HealthCare Corganizations (JCAHO).

Burials
From its opening until 1934, some 2,024 patients died and were buried on the hospital grounds. A memorial for them was erected and in 2011-2012 efforts were under way to identify all the deceased.

Notable patients
Edward Allaway
David Attias
Bettie Page
Nathan Trupp
Roderick Scribner
Ron Jeremy
Richard Turley

References

Works cited

External links

 Patton State Hospital: Home Page
 
 

Hospital buildings completed in 1893
Hospitals in San Bernardino County, California
Psychiatric hospitals in California
Hospitals established in 1893
Kirkbride Plan hospitals
1893 establishments in California